The 1927 LFF Lyga was the 6th season of the LFF Lyga football competition in Lithuania.  Statistics of the LFF Lyga for the 1927 season. LFLS Kaunas won the championship.

Kaunas Group

Klaipėda Group

North Division

South Division

Klaipėda Group Final
Sportverein Pagėgiai 2-1 Spielvereiningung Klaipėda

Šiauliai Group

Final
LFLS Kaunas 3-1 Sportverein Pagėgiai

References
RSSSF

LFF Lyga seasons
Lith
Lith
1927 in Lithuanian football